Iwaoa reticulata is a species of sea snail, a marine gastropod mollusk in the family Horaiclavidae.

It was previously included within the family Clavatulidae.

Description
The length of the shell attains 22.5 mm.

Distribution
This species occurs in the East China Sea and Suruga Bay to Tosa Bay, Japan, at a depth between 200 m and 300 m; also in the Bismarck Sea.

References

 Powell, A.W.B. (1969). The Family Turridae in the Indo-Pacific. Part. 2. The subfamily Turriculinae. . Indo-Pacific Mollusca. 2 : 215–415, pls 188–324

External links
 Photo of the shell
 Photos of the shell
 Bishogai Data base: Iwaoa reticulata

reticulata
Gastropods described in 1953